Insula Magica is a musical collective from Novosibirsk, Russia. The ensemble recreates early music.

History
In 1981, a group of students of the Novosibirsk Conservatory founded the musical collective. They were united by the idea of reconstruction of early music.

Since 1991, Insula Magica has officially become a collective of the Novosibirsk Philharmonic.

Insula Magica has participated in various festivals in Russia, France, Japan, England, Denmark and other countries.

In September 2009, the ensemble represented Russian culture in Stockholm at the 'Vox Pacis' International Festival. In October 2009, the Insula Magica and the Swedish ensemble Laude Novella conducted tour of the 'Echoes from Poltava'. it started in Novosibirsk and ended in the Poltava Field.

Repertoire
Old Russian chants, religious and secular musical works of the West European Middle Ages, Renaissance and Baroque music, music of the era of Peter the Great, Russian songs of the 18th century, the music of Bach, Handel, Pretorius, etc.

Musical instruments
The collective uses original old instruments and their copies: harpsichord, lute, viola da gamba, medieval harp, old drums, recorder, cornemuse, rancquet, and other musical instruments.

Members
 Arkady Burkhanov – ensemble leader, guitars, theorbo, wind instruments, lute
 Elena Kondratova – soprano
 Alexey Bazhenov – tenor
 Ivan Tkachenko – baritone
 Anna Nedospasova – harpsichord, clavichord, pipe organ, recorder
 Yulia Gaikolova – baroque violin
 Sergey Adamenko – lute, guitar

Antique collection
The ensemble members collected ancient manuscripts, musical documents, ancient musical instruments and costumes of different historical periods.

References

External links
 Official site
 The Novosibirsk concert began in the Stockholm Library. Vecherny Novosibirsk. Новосибирский концерт начался в Стокгольмской библиотеке. Вечерний Новосибирск.
 Ensemble Laude Novella ELNCD-0301: Echoes from Poltava. Ensemble Laude Novella. Official site.
 The magic island of ancient instruments is located in Novosibirsk. Rossiya-Kultura. Волшебный остров старинных инструментов расположен в Новосибирске. Россия-Культура.
 

Musical groups from Novosibirsk
Musical groups established in 1981
Early music groups